Ramiro Ruiz Rodríguez (born 21 March 2000) is an Argentine professional footballer who plays as a forward for Atlético Tucumán.

Professional career
Ruiz Rodríguez made his professional debut with Atlético Tucumán in a 2-2 Argentine Primera División tie with Lanús on 23 February 2020. He scored his first professional goal against Racing Club de Avellaneda on November 1, 2020.

References

External links
 

2000 births
Living people
Sportspeople from San Miguel de Tucumán
Argentine footballers
Association football forwards
Atlético Tucumán footballers
Argentine Primera División players